Grigory Isaakovich Barenblatt (10 July 1927 – 22 June 2018) was a Russian mathematician.

Education
Barenblatt graduated in 1950 from Moscow State University, Department of Mechanics and Mathematics. He received his Ph.D. in 1953 from Moscow State University under the supervision of A. N. Kolmogorov.

Career and research
Barenblatt also received a D.Sc. from Moscow State University in 1957. He was an emeritus Professor in Residence at the Department of Mathematics of the University of California, Berkeley and Mathematician at Department of Mathematics, Lawrence Berkeley National Laboratory. He was G. I. Taylor Professor of Fluid Mechanics at the University of Cambridge from 1992 to 1994 and he was Emeritus G. I. Taylor Professor of Fluid Mechanics. His areas of research were:

 Fracture mechanics
 The theory of fluid and gas flows in porous media
 The mechanics of a non-classical deformable solids
 Turbulence
 Self-similarities, nonlinear waves and intermediate asymptotics.

Awards and honors

 1975 – Foreign Honorary Member, American Academy of Arts and Sciences
 1984 – Foreign Member, Danish Center of Applied Mathematics & Mechanics
 1988 – Foreign Member, Polish Society of Theoretical & Applied Mechanics
 1989 – Doctor of Technology Honoris Causa at the Royal Institute of Technology, Stockholm, Sweden
 1992 – Foreign Associate, U.S. National Academy of Engineering
 1993 – Fellow, Cambridge Philosophical Society
 1993 – Member, Academia Europaea
 1994 – Fellow, Gonville and Caius College, Cambridge; (since 1999, Honorary Fellow)
 1995 – Lagrange Medal, Accademia Nazionale dei Lincei
 1995 – Modesto Panetti Prize and Medal
 1996 - Visiting Miller Professorship - University of California Berkeley
 1997 – Foreign Associate, U.S. National Academy of Sciences
 1999 – G. I. Taylor Medal, U.S. Society of Engineering Science
 1999 – J. C. Maxwell Medal and Prize, International Congress for Industrial and Applied Mathematics
 2000 – Foreign Member, Royal Society of London
 2005 – Timoshenko Medal, American Society of Mechanical Engineers, "for seminal contributions to nearly every area of solid and fluid mechanics, including fracture mechanics, turbulence, stratified flows, flames, flow in porous media, and the theory and application of intermediate asymptotics."

References

External links
 
 Applied mechanics: an age old science perpetually in rebirth (pdf). The Timoshenko Medal acceptance speech by Grigory Barenblatt (to be published by ASME in summer 2006).

1927 births
2018 deaths
20th-century Russian mathematicians
21st-century Russian mathematicians
Fellows of the American Academy of Arts and Sciences
Fellows of Gonville and Caius College, Cambridge
Fluid dynamicists
Foreign Members of the Royal Society
Jewish scientists
Members of Academia Europaea
Foreign associates of the National Academy of Sciences
Moscow State University alumni
Mathematicians from Moscow
Russian Jews
University of California, Berkeley College of Letters and Science faculty
Foreign associates of the National Academy of Engineering
Professors of the University of Cambridge